Flecha del Sur  (Arrow of the South) was the name of a diesel train, AM-100 series, used for the first time on the southern Chilean rail network around 1940.

Overview
The diesel-electric model was custom built in Germany for the Chilean government by Maschinenfabrik Augsburg-Nürnberg and FerroStaal A.G. based on the success of the Flying Hamburger series that connected Berlin and Hamburg since 1933 and, as traditional in that time involving government's purchase of rail equipment, part of the payment was made via shipments of lentils. The series was made of six two-car units using a Jacobs bogie setup, each one having two 600 hp MAN engines electrified with AEG equipment that accelerated the 124 first class passengers convoys to a maximum speed of 130 km/h.

In 1948 their scheduled frequency was three weekly services in winter and six in summer, starting at Santiago's Estación Central railway station on 07:00 to reach Puerto Montt's station at 00.20.

External links 
Briefing and pictures from the Chilean Association of Railroad Patrimony Conservancy (in spanish)
Detailed history, technical facts, brochures and pictures (in spanish)

Passenger rail transport in Chile